The Avesta is the primary collection of religious texts of Zoroastrianism, composed in the Avestan language.

The Avesta texts fall into several different categories, arranged either by dialect, or by usage. The principal text in the liturgical group is the Yasna, which takes its name from the Yasna ceremony, Zoroastrianism's primary act of worship, and at which the Yasna text is recited. The most important portion of the Yasna texts are the five Gathas, consisting of seventeen hymns attributed to Zoroaster himself. These hymns, together with five other short Old Avestan texts that are also part of the Yasna, are in the Old (or 'Gathic') Avestan language. The remainder of the Yasna's texts are in Younger Avestan, which is not only from a later stage of the language, but also from a different geographic region.

Extensions to the Yasna ceremony include the texts of the Vendidad and the Visperad. The Visperad extensions consist mainly of additional invocations of the divinities (yazatas), while the Vendidad is a mixed collection of prose texts mostly dealing with purity laws. Even today, the Vendidad is the only liturgical text that is not recited entirely from memory. Some of the materials of the extended Yasna are from the Yashts, which are hymns to the individual yazatas. Unlike the Yasna, Visperad and Vendidad, the Yashts and the other lesser texts of the Avesta are no longer used liturgically in high rituals. Aside from the Yashts, these other lesser texts include the Nyayesh texts, the Gah texts, the Siroza, and various other fragments. Together, these lesser texts are conventionally called Khordeh Avesta or "Little Avesta" texts. When the first Khordeh Avesta editions were printed in the 19th century, these texts (together with some non-Avestan language prayers) became a book of common prayer for lay people.

The term Avesta is from the 9th/10th-century works of Zoroastrian tradition in which the word appears as Middle Persian  abestāg, Book Pahlavi ʾp(y)stʾkʼ.  In that context, abestāg texts are portrayed as received knowledge, and are distinguished from the exegetical commentaries (the zand) thereof. The literal meaning of the word abestāg is uncertain; it is generally acknowledged to be a learned borrowing from Avestan, but none of the suggested etymologies have been universally accepted. The widely repeated derivation from *upa-stavaka is from Christian Bartholomae (Altiranisches Wörterbuch, 1904), who interpreted abestāg as a descendant of a hypothetical reconstructed Old Iranian word for "praise-song" (Bartholomae: Lobgesang); but this word is not actually attested in any text.

Historiography
The surviving texts of the Avesta, as they exist today, derive from a single master copy produced by collation and recension in the Sasanian Empire (224–651 CE). That master copy, now lost, is known as the 'Sassanian archetype'. The oldest surviving manuscript (K1) of an Avestan language text is dated 1323 CE. Summaries of the various Avesta texts found in the 9th/10th century texts of Zoroastrian tradition suggest that a significant portion of the literature in the Avestan language has been lost. Only about one-quarter of the Avestan sentences or verses referred to by the 9th/10th century commentators can be found in the surviving texts. This suggests that three-quarters of Avestan material, including an indeterminable number of juridical, historical and legendary texts, have been lost since then. On the other hand, it appears that the most valuable portions of the canon, including all of the oldest texts, have survived. The likely reason for this is that the surviving materials represent those portions of the Avesta that were in regular liturgical use, and therefore known by heart by the priests and not dependent for their preservation on the survival of particular manuscripts.

A pre-Sasanian history of the Avesta, if it had one, lies in the realm of legend and myth. The oldest surviving versions of these tales are found in the ninth to 11th century CE texts of Zoroastrian tradition (i.e. in the so-called "Pahlavi books"). The legends run as follows: The twenty-one nasks ("books") of the Avesta were created by Ahura Mazda and brought by Zoroaster to his patron Vishtaspa (Denkard 4A, 3A). Supposedly, Vishtaspa (Dk 3A) or another Kayanian, Daray (Dk 4B), then had two copies made, one of which was stored in the treasury, and the other in the royal archives (Dk 4B, 5). Following Alexander's conquest, the Avesta was then supposedly destroyed or dispersed by the Greeks, after they had translated any scientific passages of which they could make use (AVN 7–9, Dk 3B, 8). Several centuries later, one of the Parthian emperors named Valaksh (one of the Vologases) supposedly then had the fragments collected, not only of those that had previously been written down, but also of those that had only been orally transmitted (Dk 4C).

The Denkard also records another legend related to the transmission of the Avesta. In this story, credit for collation and recension is given to the early Sasanian-era priest Tansar (high priest under Ardashir I, r. 224–242 CE, and Shapur I, 240/242–272 CE), who had the scattered works collected - of which he approved only a part as authoritative (Dk 3C, 4D, 4E). Tansar's work was then supposedly completed by Adurbad Mahraspandan (high priest of Shapur II, r. 309–379 CE) who made a general revision of the canon and continued to ensure its orthodoxy (Dk 4F, AVN 1.12–1.16). A final revision was supposedly undertaken in the 6th century CE under Khosrow I (Dk 4G).

In the early 20th century, the legend of the Parthian-era collation engendered a search for a 'Parthian archetype' of the Avesta. According to the theory of Friedrich Carl Andreas (1902), the archaic nature of the Avestan texts was assumed to be due to preservation via written transmission, and unusual or unexpected spellings in the surviving texts were assumed to be reflections of errors introduced by Sasanian-era transcription from the Aramaic alphabet-derived Pahlavi scripts. The search for the 'Arsacid archetype' was increasingly criticized in the 1940s and was eventually abandoned in the 1950s after Karl Hoffmann demonstrated that the inconsistencies noted by Andreas were actually due to unconscious alterations introduced by oral transmission. Hoffmann identifies these changes to be due, in part, to modifications introduced through recitation; in part to influences from other Iranian languages picked up on the route of transmission from somewhere in eastern Iran (i.e. Central Asia) via Arachosia and Sistan through to Persia; and in part due to the influence of phonetic developments in the Avestan language itself.

The legends of an Arsacid-era collation and recension are no longer taken seriously. It is now certain that for most of their long history the Avesta's various texts were handed down orally, and independently of one another, and that it was not until around the 5th or 6th century CE that they were committed to written form. However, during their long history, only the Gathic texts seem to have been memorized (more or less) exactly. The other less sacred works appear to have been handed down in a more fluid oral tradition, and were partly composed afresh with each generation of poet-priests, sometimes with the addition of new material. The Younger Avestan texts are therefore composite works, with contributions from several different authors over the course of several hundred years.

The texts became available to European scholarship comparatively late, thus the study of Zoroastrianism in Western countries dates back to only the 18th century. Abraham Hyacinthe Anquetil-Duperron travelled to India in 1755, and discovered the texts among Indian Zoroastrian (Parsi) communities. He published a set of French translations in 1771, based on translations provided by a Parsi priest. Anquetil-Duperron's translations were at first dismissed as a forgery in poor Sanskrit, but he was vindicated in the 1820s following Rasmus Rask's examination of the Avestan language (A Dissertation on the Authenticity of the Zend Language, Bombay, 1821). Rask also established that Anquetil-Duperron's manuscripts were a fragment of a much larger literature of sacred texts. Anquetil-Duperron's manuscripts are at the Bibliothèque nationale de France ('P'-series manuscripts), while Rask's collection now lies in the Royal Library, Denmark ('K'-series). Other large Avestan language manuscript collections are those of the British Museum ('L'-series), the K. R. Cama Oriental Library in Mumbai, the Meherji Rana library in Navsari, and at various university and national libraries in Europe.

Structure and content
In its present form, the Avesta is a compilation from various sources, and its different parts date from different periods and vary widely in character. Only texts in the Avestan language are considered part of the Avesta.

According to the Denkard, the 21 nasks (books) mirror the structure of the 21-word-long Ahuna Vairya prayer: each of the three lines of the prayer consists of seven words. Correspondingly, the nasks are divided into three groups, of seven volumes per group. Originally, each volume had a word of the prayer as its name, which so marked a volume's position relative to the other volumes. Only about a quarter of the text from the nasks has survived to the present day.

The contents of the Avesta are divided topically (even though the organization of the nasks is not), but these are not fixed or canonical. Some scholars prefer to place the categories in two groups, one liturgical, and the other general. The following categorization is as described by Jean Kellens (see bibliography, below).

The Yasna

The Yasna (from yazišn "worship, oblations", cognate with Sanskrit yajña), is the primary liturgical collection, named after the ceremony at which it is recited. It consists of 72 sections called the Ha-iti or Ha. The 72 threads of lamb's wool in the Kushti, the sacred thread worn by Zoroastrians, represent these sections. The central portion of the Yasna is the Gathas, the oldest and most sacred portion of the Avesta, believed to have been composed by Zarathushtra (Zoroaster) himself. The Gathas are structurally interrupted by the Yasna Haptanghaiti ("seven-chapter Yasna"), which makes up chapters 35–42 of the Yasna and is almost as old as the Gathas, consists of prayers and hymns in honor of Ahura Mazda, the Yazatas, the Fravashi, Fire, Water, and Earth. The younger Yasna, though handed down in prose, may once have been metrical, as the Gathas still are.

The Visperad

The Visperad (from vîspe ratavo, "(prayer to) all patrons") is a collection of supplements to the Yasna. The Visparad is subdivided into 23 or 24 kardo (sections) that are interleaved into the Yasna during a Visperad service (which is an extended Yasna service).

The Visperad collection has no unity of its own, and is never recited separately from the Yasna.

The Vendidad

The Vendidad (or Vidēvdāt, a corruption of Avestan Vī-Daēvō-Dāta, "Given Against the Demons") is an enumeration of various manifestations of evil spirits, and ways to confound them. The Vendidad includes all of the 19th nask, which is the only nask that has survived in its entirety. The text consists of 22 Fargards, fragments arranged as discussions between Ahura Mazda and Zoroaster. The first fargard is a dualistic creation myth, followed by the description of a destructive winter (compare Fimbulvetr) on the lines of the Flood myth. The second fargard recounts the legend of Yima. The remaining fargards deal primarily with hygiene (care of the dead in particular) [fargard 3, 5, 6, 7, 8, 9, 10, 16, 17, 19] as well as disease and spells to fight it [7, 10, 11, 13, 20, 21, 22]. Fargards 4 and 15 discuss the dignity of wealth and charity, of marriage and of physical effort, and the indignity of unacceptable social behaviour such as assault and breach of contract, and specify the penances required to atone for violations thereof. The Vendidad is an ecclesiastical code, not a liturgical manual, and there is a degree of moral relativism apparent in the codes of conduct. The Vendidads different parts vary widely in character and in age. Some parts may be comparatively recent in origin although the greater part is very old.

The Vendidad, unlike the Yasna and the Visparad, is a book of moral laws rather than the record of a liturgical ceremony. However, there is a ceremony called the Vendidad, in which the Yasna is recited with all the chapters of both the Visparad and the Vendidad inserted at appropriate points. This ceremony is only performed at night.

The Yashts

The Yashts (from yešti, "worship by praise") are a collection of 21 hymns, each dedicated to a particular divinity or divine concept. Three hymns of the Yasna liturgy that "worship by praise" are—in tradition—also nominally called yashts, but are not counted among the Yasht collection since the three are a part of the primary liturgy. The Yashts vary greatly in style, quality and extent. In their present form, they are all in prose but analysis suggests that they may at one time have been in verse.

The Siroza
The Siroza ("thirty days") is an enumeration and invocation of the 30 divinities presiding over the days of the month. (cf. Zoroastrian calendar). The Siroza exists in two forms, the shorter ("little Siroza") is a brief enumeration of the divinities with their epithets in the genitive. The longer ("great Siroza") has complete sentences and sections, with the yazatas being addressed in the accusative.

The Siroza is never recited as a whole, but is a source for individual sentences devoted to particular divinities, to be inserted at appropriate points in the liturgy depending on the day and the month.

The Nyayeshes
The five Nyayeshes, abbreviated Ny., are prayers for regular recitation by both priests and laity. They are addressed to the Sun and Mithra (recited together thrice a day), to the Moon (recited thrice a month), and to the Waters and to Fire. The Nyayeshes are composite texts containing selections from the Gathas and the Yashts, as well as later material.

The Gahs

The five gāhs are invocations to the five divinities that watch over the five divisions (gāhs) of the day. Gāhs are similar in structure and content to the five Nyayeshes.

The Afrinagans
The Afrinagans are four "blessing" texts recited on a particular occasion: the first in honor of the dead, the second on the five epagomenal days that end the year, the third is recited at the six seasonal feasts, and the fourth at the beginning and end of summer.

Fragments
All material in the Avesta that is not already present in one of the other categories is placed in a "fragments" category, which – as the name suggests – includes incomplete texts. There are altogether more than 20 fragment collections, many of which have no name (and are then named after their owner/collator) or only a Middle Persian name. The more important of the fragment collections are the Nirangistan fragments (18 of which constitute the Ehrbadistan); the Pursishniha "questions," also known as "Fragments Tahmuras"; and the Hadokht Nask "volume of the scriptures" with two fragments of eschatological significance.

Other Zoroastrian religious texts
Only texts preserved in the Avestan language count as scripture and are part of the Avesta. Several other secondary works are nonetheless crucial to Zoroastrian theology and scholarship.

The most notable among the Middle Persian texts are the Dēnkard ("Acts of Religion"), dating from the ninth century; the Bundahishn ("Primordial Creation"), finished in the eleventh or twelfth century, but containing older material; the Mainog-i-Khirad ("Spirit of Wisdom"), a religious conference on questions of faith; and the Book of Arda Viraf, which is especially important for its views on death, salvation and life in the hereafter. Of the post-14th century works (all in New Persian), only the Sad-dar ("Hundred Doors, or Chapters"), and Revayats (traditional treatises) are of doctrinal importance. Other texts such as Zartushtnamah ("Book of Zoroaster") are only notable for their preservation of legend and folklore. The Aogemadaeca "we accept," a treatise on death is based on quotations from the Avesta.

References

Notes

Citations

Works cited

.
 .
 .
 .
 .
 .
 .

External links 

 avesta.org: translation by James Darmesteter and L. H. Mills forms part of the Sacred Books of the East series, but is now regarded as obsolete.
 
The British Library: Discovering Sacred Texts - Zoroastrianism

 
Sources of ancient Iranian religion
Zoroastrian texts